The Illinois Street Historic District encompasses the principal business and residential area of the Fairbanks Exploration Company in Fairbanks, Alaska.  It extends along Illinois Street from Slater Street to Noyes Slough, including a series of residential properties on the east side of the road, and the surviving buildings of the F.E. Company complex on the west side.  The F.E. Company was a dominating economic force in interior Alaska during the second quarter of the 20th century, and its operations were managed and organized from this area.  Included in the district are eight houses, including the Colonial Revival Manager's House and a group of 4 bungalows built by the company for its employees.  The company also acquired and refurbished the 1911 home of Fred Noyes, for whom Noyes Slough is named.  Of the company's once-extensive industrial complex on the west side of Illinois Street, only the administration building (612 Illinois Street) and the machine shop (behind the administration building and across the railroad tracks) survive. A portion of Illinois Street, which follows the original alignment of a dirt track through the area, is also included in the district.

The district was listed on the National Register of Historic Places in 2001.

Contributing Properties
The historical district contains a total of 14 contributing properties, built between 1911 and 1935:
 Johnson-Hayr House at 303 Illinois Street, built c. 1930.
 Mapleton-Seton House at 315 Illinois Street, built c. 1930.
 Noyes House, now known as the Chapel of Chimes Funeral Home, at 407 Illinois Street, built c. 1911.
 The seven buildings comprised in F.E. Company Housing historical district, at 505, 507, 521 and 523 Illinois Street, built 1927–1928.
 The F.E. Company Manager's House, at 757 Illinois Street, built 1935.
 The F.E. Company Administrative Office, at 700 block Illinois Street, built c. 1927.
 The F.E. Company Machine Shop, at 612 Illinois Street, built 1927.
 Illinois Street itself, for the tract comprised between Slater Street and Noyes Slough.

See also

National Register of Historic Places listings in Fairbanks North Star Borough, Alaska

References

2001 establishments in Alaska
Buildings and structures in Fairbanks, Alaska
Bungalow architecture in Alaska
Colonial Revival architecture in Alaska
Gold mining in Alaska
Historic districts on the National Register of Historic Places in Alaska
National Register of Historic Places in Fairbanks North Star Borough, Alaska
Tudor Revival architecture in Alaska